The Fox Cub Bold is the fourth book of The Animals of Farthing Wood series. It was first published in 1983 and has since been included in a single book with Fox's Feud and in the "Omnibus" edition (Hutchinson, 1994) with Fox's Feud and In the Grip of Winter.

Plot summary
Having left White Deer Park after the defeat of Scarface, Bold is exploring his new surroundings which he refers to as "the real world". He sees a magpie, which criticises him for being out during the daytime and feeding off scraps that many smaller animals would be grateful for, instead of hunting for his own food. Next he encounters a carrion crow who warns him that humans could be about. Bold ignores this warning as he sees nothing to fear from humans and in the following days he encounters several humans who do no harm to him at all, which increases his confidence.

A few weeks later, Bold discovers a game wood on some farmland and develops a taste for game birds (mainly partridges and pheasants). He sleeps in a badger set, but its owner soon arrives and wakes him up. Bold is friendly towards this female badger and she warns him about the humans in the area. Bold ignores this warning too and upon coming across a collection of animals killed by the gamekeeper kills and eats a bird in front of it as an act of defiance. However, a few days later he discovers the female badger in a snare. Though he manages to save her by biting through a wire, this wire snaps back and injures his eye. The badger is grateful and offers to help Bold whenever he may need her.

One day, Bold hears the sound of gunfire and discovers he has been caught in a pheasant shoot. When a dog comes towards him to get a dead pheasant, he tries to run away but runs towards the hunters because his bad eye prevents him from  seeing them. One of the hunters then shoots him through the leg. Bold limps across the field with his injured leg dragging along the ground and eventually reaches a ditch where he is out of sight. Bold sees a dormouse nearby and tries to catch it, but is no longer nimble enough. Bold is unable to move far from the ditch and his diet consists mainly of slugs and insects he can find nearby. Unfortunately, those do not provide enough sustenance and Bold becomes very weak. He is found by the crow he met previously and Bold asks the bird for help, but the crow refuses until Bold tells him that his father is the famous Farthing Wood Fox. After this, the crow agrees to help him and heads off to find the badger that Bold helped. She eventually arrives with three of her kin and they feed Bold. One of the badger's offspring suggests that Bold should return to their set until he recovers.

A few days later, Bold prepares to travel back to the game wood with the female badger, whom he has decided to call Shadow because she constantly watches over him. Due to Bold's injury they travel very slowly and when Shadow goes hunting Bold decides to leave as he do not want to be dependent on others. He finds an abandoned earth containing the remains of another fox's catches, which he gratefully devours. The next day he tries to catch a vole but has no success. He then resolves to live by raiding the food supplies of humans as revenge for his injuries.

The next day, Bold travels to a nearby farm and comes across a pair of bantams which have been allowed to make their nest in the open. They notice the young fox and escape, but Bold is able to eat the eggs that they have abandoned in their nest. He returns to the farm a few days later and catches one of the bantams (it runs towards him after being startled). While taking it back to his earth, he meets Shadow again in a Swede field. Bold does not want to talk to her as he does not want to share the bantam but Shadow see him. Despite offering part of the bantam Shadow insists that Bold has all of it. Bold returns to the farm the next evening but the remaining bantam has been locked away and the farm dog sees him, forcing Bold to escape. Two humans use their terrier to track down Bold and dig up his earth, but when they see his weakened state they assume he cannot be the culprit and that his mate must have killed the bantam. Assuming Bold will not survive the winter they leave him alone.

Bold again meets the crow, who suggests that he scavenge for food in a nearby town. It takes Bold several days to arrive, but when he does the two friends agree to collect food for each other in their scavenging. The crow is the first to look for food and after telling Bold that he has eaten some food left out for a dog or cat Bold decides to call him Robber. As Bold is injured he cannot jump over fences meaning he cannot get into most gardens, so his scavenging is limited. One evening while scavenging Bold sees a vixen in one of the gardens, but she completely ignores him and Bold feels humiliated. Several days later Bold sees the vixen in the garden once more and tries to dig his way in but she comes out to greet him. She tells Bold she moved into this town during the winter because food is more plentiful and offers to help him hunt but Bold's pride causes him to reject her offer.

The vixen sees Bold again a month later and tells him she wants to hunt with him, and this time Bold does not refuse. Together they catch some rats and Bold calls her Whisper because of her stealth. Whisper offers to let Bold stay in her earth, but he goes back to his usual home to give one of the rats to Robber. When Bold tells Robber about Whisper, the crow insists that his friend forget their agreement and go to live in the vixen's earth, which Bold does the following night. Bold is unable to jump the wall to get in, but they find a hole through which he can enter. In the earth Whisper mistakes Bold for a much older fox and asks where he was born. Bold tells her he was born in White Deer Park and that his father is the famous Farthing Wood Fox, and Whisper makes a plan which Bold knows nothing of.

A few days later they come across a large dog who barks loudly outside their earth. One day Bold cannot get back into the earth because the wall has been mended and the dog pursues him, so Bold hastily tries to make a new hole but gets stuck. Robber comes to his rescue but the dog turns out to be friendly and he helps Bold to make the hole in the wall big enough for him to get through. The dog, a mastiff, tells them his name is Rollo and that he is very lonely during the day as his master has left him nothing to play with. He visits the foxes frequently during the day in the ensuing weeks, even though the foxes are trying to sleep during the day. As mating season arrives the two foxes mate and Whisper is soon carrying Bold's cubs. Whisper tells Bold that she chose him as her mate because he was a cub of the Farthing Fox and she wants their cubs to be born in White Deer Park. Bold is crushed by this but he reluctantly agrees to lead her there. The foxes are fed for their last few days in the town by Rollo, and they head off back towards the country.

Heavy snow makes travelling difficult for Bold, so their pace is very slow. Whisper wants to speed up but traveling through the slush exhausts Bold and he collapses on open land. He insists that Whisper go to find cover while he rests. Robber, who has been tracking their journey, discovers Bold on the ground and promises to bring Bold some food. Robber heads back to Rollo, who agrees to bring a bone he has buried to Bold and Whisper. While waiting, Bold digs himself into the snow to hide himself. However, two men with two greyhounds are chasing a hare. One greyhound kills the hare, the other chases Bold. Fortunately, Robber arrives and distracts the greyhound until Rollo gets there. Rollo then grabs the greyhound by the neck, shakes it, and casts it away. Rollo brings the foxes his bone and the hare killed by the other greyhound before heading back home to his master.

As the foxes approach White Deer Park, Bold leaves Whisper while she is sleeping and hides himself away, forcing her to finish the journey alone. She arrives at the reserve and meets Charmer, who immediately tells her family of Bold's return. Meanwhile, Robber has noticed Bold go into hiding and offers to feed him, but the injured fox wants to wait for his death. Robber notices Fox and Friendly searching outside the park and leads them to Bold, joining up with Vixen and Charmer along the way. The foxes arrive and Fox tells Bold how proud he is, before the young fox passes away.

Television series
The events of this book are covered in the second half of the second season of The Animals of Farthing Wood (TV series), though the sequence of events is changed slightly. Also Rollo is changed from an English Mastiff to a St. Bernard.

See also

1983 British novels
1983 fantasy novels
Animals of Farthing Wood books
Children's fantasy novels
Hutchinson (publisher) books
1983 children's books